Mir Kabeer Ahmed Muhammad Shahi is a Baloch tribal leader and politician who was a member of Senate of Pakistan, representing National Party. His Father Mir Abdullah Jan Muhammad Shahi was a part of the Baloch Nationalist cause in the 80s and 90s.

Education
He has done Master of Public Administration (MPA) and L.L.B.

Political career
He was elected to the Senate of Pakistan as a candidate of National Party in 2015 Pakistani Senate election.

References

Living people
Pakistani senators (14th Parliament)
Year of birth missing (living people)